Balaguères is a commune in the Ariège department in the Occitanie region of south-western France.

The inhabitants of the commune are known as Balaguérois or Balaguéroises.

Geography
Balaguères is located some 4 km north-east of Audressein and 12 km south-west of Saint-Girons in the Parc naturel régional des Pyrénées ariégeoises. The north-west border of the commune is also the departmental border between Ariège and Haute-Garonne. Access to the commune is by the D618 road from Engomer in the east which passes through the south of the commune and continues south-west to Audressein. Access to the main village of Alas is by the D204A from Engomer and several local roads. The D204 goes north-west from the village through the hamlet of Agert to the hamlet of Balagué in the commune. The commune is farmland in the valley and forested on the mountain slopes.

The Lez river flows through the south of the commune and the village from south-west to east and continues east then north-east to join the Salat at Saint-Girons. The Ruisseau de Lachein flows from the north-west through the commune, gathering several tributaries, to join the Lez at the village.

Neighbouring communes and villages

History
Balagué, Agert, and Alas were all part of the lordship of Aspet in the 12th century together with Engomer, Montgauch, Bareilles, and Mauvezin de Prat. This lordship became a powerful Barony in the Middle Ages. On 12 December 1642 Guy d'Encausse, Lord of Labastide (near Rieucazé) purchased Alas-Balagué and gave it to Jean-Jacques de Solan. By decree in April 1667 King Louis XIV ordered the purchase of 18 parishes that had been committed in 1642 and 1643. They all returned to the Crown lands of France. Later, however, some were sold again (Castelbiague, Pointis-Inard, Alas-Agert-Balagué). Others remained in paréage with the king: Affis (His), Arbas, Ganties, Mauvezin, Montastruc, and Rouède. The rest remained permanently in the hands of the king as sole lord: Aspet, Chein, Escaich, Estadens, Montgauch-Bareilles, and Saleich.

Administration

List of Mayors

Mayors from 1936

Demography
In 2017 the commune had 197 inhabitants.

Culture and heritage

Cultural distinctions
Balaguères is one of the communes that have received the Esperanto Green Star, a distinction awarded to mayors of communes who identify with the speakers of the constructed language of Esperanto.

Balaguères was one of the filming locations for the film: The Return of Martin Guerre in 1982 with Nathalie Baye, Gérard Depardieu, and Bernard-Pierre Donnadieu.

Religious heritage
The Church of Agert contains two items that are registered as historical objects:
A Ciborium (18th century)
A Chalice (18th century)
The Church of Alas contains four items that are registered as historical objects:
A Ciborium (17th century)
A Framed Painting: The Virgin and child donating a rosary to Saints Dominic and Catherine of Sienna (18th century)
A Chalice with Paten (17th century)
A Confessional (18th century)

Environmental heritage
The Réseau Paloume, a natural cavity at more than 750 m altitude.

See also
Communes of the Ariège department

Notes

References

External links
Balaguères on Géoportail, National Geographic Institute (IGN) website 
Balagué, Agert, and Alas on the 1750 Cassini Map

Communes of Ariège (department)